Qarah Shahverdi (also Romanized as Qarah Shāhverdī; also known as Aḩmadābād) is a village in Quchan Atiq Rural District, in the Central District of Quchan County, Razavi Khorasan Province, Iran. At the 2006 census, its population was 802, in 180 families.

References 

Populated places in Quchan County